The 2008–09 Maltese Second Division season, also known as the 2008–09 BOV 2nd Division  due to sponsorship reason) started on 27 September 2008 and ended on 10 May 2009. Mellieha and Marsa were relegated from the First Division. The promoted teams were Gozo FC and Zebbug Rangers. Zebbug had to start the season with a five point deduction due to incidents which occurred the previous season. The 2008–09 Maltese Second Division was won by Balzan.The runners-up were Melita, who finished 2 points off Lija Athletic. Mgarr United and Marsa were relegated to the Third Division. This was the third straight relegation for Marsa, who 3 years previously were competing in the Premier League and now have to compete in the Third Division. Naxxar Lions were also relegated as they lost in the promotion-relegation play-offs to Santa Lucia. The play-offs were won by Zurrieq.

Participating teams

 Balzan
 Birżebbuġa
 Gozo
 Lija
 Marsa
 Mellieħa
 Melita
 Mġarr
 Naxxar
 St. Andrews
 Santa Venera
 Żebbuġ

Changes from previous season
 San Gwann and Rabat Ajax were promoted to 2008–09 Maltese First Division. They were replaced with Mellieha and Marsa, both relegated from 2007–08 Maltese First Division
 Zurrieq and Sirens were relegated to 2008–09 Maltese Third Division. They were replaced with Gozo FC and Zebbug Rangers, both promoted from 2007–08 Maltese Third Division.

Final league table

Relegation-promotion play-off
Participating

Quarter final 

|}

Gudja United remain in Maltese Third Division

Semi finals

|}

Mdina Knights remain in Maltese Third Division
Naxxar Lions relegated to Maltese Third Division

Final

|}

Zurrieq promoted to Maltese Second Division
Santa Lucia remain in Maltese Third Division

Results

Top scorers

Maltese Second Division seasons
Malta
3